In the 2009 science-fiction film Avatar, director James Cameron conceived a fictional universe in which humans seek to mine unobtanium on the fictional habitable exomoon Pandora. The Earth-like moon is inhabited by a sapient indigenous humanoid species called the Na'vi, as well as varied fauna and flora. Resources Development Administration (RDA―which, despite the name, is a public company which evolved from a Silicon Valley startup) scientists, administrators, recruits, support, and security personnel travel to Pandora in the 22nd century to discover this beautiful, lush world, which is inhabited by many lifeforms including the human-like Na'vi. The clan with which the humans have contact in the film lives "in a giant tree that sits on a vast store of a mineral called unobtainium, which humans want as an energy supply."

Na'vi 

The Na'vi are humanoid creatures that inhabit Pandora along with other creatures. They use animals ranging from direhorses to even viperwolves.

The world of Pandora

The Pandoran biosphere teems with a biodiversity of bioluminescent species ranging from six-legged animals to other types of exotic fauna and flora.  The Pandoran ecology forms a vast biological neural network spanning the entire lunar surface into which the Na'vi and other creatures can connect. The strength of this collective consciousness is powerfully illustrated when the human invaders are defeated in battle by the Pandora ecology after the resolute Na'vi were nearly defeated. Cameron used a team of expert advisors in order to make the various examples of fauna and flora as scientifically feasible as possible.

Astronomy and geology

It is one of the many natural satellites orbiting the gas giant Polyphemus, named for the Polyphemus of Greek mythology. Pandora's atmosphere is a mix of nitrogen, oxygen, carbon dioxide, xenon, methane, ammonia and hydrogen sulfide, the latter three of which are unbreathable for humans, who wear Exo-Packs when outside their buildings or vehicles. The atmosphere of Pandora does have enough oxygen for humans (21%-22%), but too much carbon dioxide (16%-18%). The Na'vi have special organs (similar to kidneys) called Wichow that take advantage of this atmosphere to extract greater amounts of oxygen for their bloodstream. These organs use carbon dioxide and water in their bodies and convert them into methane and oxygen. The methane is exhaled back into the atmosphere. The extra oxygen is added to the Na'vi bloodstream to help power their extra-large bodies and powerful muscles. This process accounts for the small amount of methane in the Pandoran atmosphere. At rest or when the Na'vi are dormant, those same organs can convert some small amounts of methane back into carbon dioxide and water to replenish their water supply if needed. This is why humans can survive with just a filtration system (Exo-Packs), but the Navi need higher amounts of carbon dioxide to function. The high level of carbon dioxide and other gases such as hydrogen sulfide also help keep the Na'vi bloodstream a slightly acidic pH around 5.25-5.75 (humans 7.35-7.45).  

Leri Greer, a designer at Weta Workshop, explained the unusual day/night cycle experienced by the Na'vi, who inhabit a moon orbiting a planet, that in turn orbits around a star.

Pandora has tropical rainforests that cover much of its continents. Pandora also possesses a weaker gravitational force than Earth. The geology of Pandora is strongly affected by the presence of unobtanium, a mineral whose superconductive properties allow it to float in magnetic fields (flux pinning). This property makes it highly valued by humans, who mine it for transport back to Earth. Pandora's levitating Hallelujah Mountains contain significant quantities of unobtanium, which allows them to ride the strong magnetic fields in their region.

Cameron hopes to explore the other moons in future sequels, books, and spin-offs.

Human interest

In the Avatar universe (set in the year 2154), humans have achieved a very technologically advanced, post-industrial society ruled/dominated by powerful corporations and industries. One of Earth's most powerful corporations is the globally integrated Resources Development Administration (RDA), a public company which evolved from a Silicon Valley startup, that owns all resources off Earth. The Interplanetary Commerce Administration granted these sole rights to the RDA under the stipulation that the use of weapons of mass destruction is prohibited. Known RDA personnel on Pandora include head administrator Parker Selfridge, Colonel Miles Quaritch, Private Sean Fike, Corporal Lyle Wainfleet, Dr. Max Patel, Dr. Grace Augustine, Dr. Norm Spellman, Samson 16 pilot Trudy Chacon, and many others.

Although Earth is never seen in the film, other than in the extended collector's edition, Cameron developed the future Earth of Avatar as a dystopian, overpopulated, overpolluted, global urban slum wrecked by corrupt, nature-destroying industrialism; the movie's background cyberpunk theme is a regular feature of his work. According to Jake, one of the main characters, the Earth is a "dying world" where humans have "killed their mother", suggesting that there is very little, if any, functioning natural ecosystem left. By the film's 22nd century timeframe, Earth faces a worldwide economic/energy crisis due to the depletion of natural resources. Earth is also apparently so politically unstable that the services of private security contractors and the militaries of Earth's nations are in high demand; Colonel Miles Quaritch boasts about serving three combat tours of duty in Nigeria before coming to Pandora and notes that Jake is a veteran of a military operation in Venezuela. The planet has also suffered serious natural and man-made disasters, such as an intra-continental conflict and tsunamis hitting the east and west coasts of the United States.

Technology

Technologically, humans have achieved monumental advancements by 2154: interplanetary and interstellar space travel and colonization; virtual 3D printing and holography mapping; and advanced methods of cryonics and psionics (via synthetic telepathy interface) are employed. Using their capability of advanced genetic engineering, humans develop "Avatar" hybrid bodies from genetically distinct modified-human DNA and Na'vi alien genetic material. Through psionics, genetically matched humans are then mind-linked to these "Avatars" for remote control operation. In the area of medicine, humans have developed advanced stem cell neuroregeneration technology that can cure Jake's paralysis. However, in 2154, it is still extremely expensive and is not covered by Veterans Affairs benefits. Thus, RDA is initially able to use Jake's desire to regain the use of his legs as leverage against him.

As with many science fiction films, many space vehicles, aircraft, ground vehicles, weapons, and technologies were created to fit the story. Many were patterned after historical or contemporary technologies to give the film a sense of futuristic realism. Concept artist Ryan Church based many drawings on aerodynamic research from previously classified NASA and DARPA technical papers. Unlike the movie Aliens which employed one drop ship from de-orbit to ground combat, several vehicles cover specific roles of utility transport, gunship, and base resupply. This is similar to the specialization of aircraft and helicopters in the United States military since the Vietnam war.

Amplified Mobility Platform 

Amplified Mobility Platforms (also known as AMP suits) are MK-6 vehicles redesigned for Pandora's hostile environment. They are worn and controlled as a large "mech" motorized suit. They are  exoskeletons powered by ceramic turbines. Soldiers at Hell's Gate use these for patrol and for battle. AMP suits are controlled via a semi-master-slave system – with the AMP's arm motion slaved to the pilot's arm motion. Motion-sensing gloves worn by the pilot are used to control the AMP arms – the result being that the AMP's arm movements exactly match the pilot's movement. In their military role, AMP's are usually armed with 30mm GAU-90 autocannons, (occasionally equipped with a blade below the barrel, allowing the AMP to cut its way through denser foliage without putting the weapon aside) which the suit deploys as a soldier or Marine would hold and use a rifle. There is an ammo belt that extends into the gun, into an ammo canister on the shoulder, over the arm, into a socket at the back. The GAU-90 fires 350 rounds per minute. The AMP suit has GPS, thermal imaging display, FLIR, and radar. Stan Winston Studios animator and Avatar Design Supervisor John Rosengrant described the AMP suit as "An Apache helicopter with legs". It also has a ceramic knife that is three feet long. Quaritch owns an AMP suit and has named it "Beyond Glory". Its GAU-90 has a dragon painted on the ammo tube.

SA-2 Samson 

The SA-2 Samson is a twin-ducted fan VTOL utility aircraft, similar in role and appearance to the real-world UH-60 Black Hawk, Mi-8 or UH-1 Huey utility helicopters. It is armed with two door-mounted machine guns and two pylons near the cockpit with missile pods mounted on them. The pair of ducted-fan assemblies, each with two coaxial propellers, enable the Samson of 6,000 kilograms lifting capability by manufacturers specifications, but lifting performance is rated at 150% of that on Pandora due to the thicker atmosphere. Both ducted-fan assemblies are capable of changing blade pitch independently. From the pilot perspective, forward and aft, lift, yaw, and roll authority are accomplished by similar sets of controls found in conventional helicopters. Propulsion is twin Goetz-Korman turbine generators.

AT-99 Scorpion Gunship 

The AT-99 Scorpion Gunship is the heavily armed gunship counterpart to the SA-2 Samson and is similar in role and appearance to the AH-64 Apache, Mi-28 or AH-1 Cobra gunships. Dual co-axial ducted-fan rotor systems with a total of four prop-rotors each with three blades lead as the aircraft's primary propulsion. It drives on redundant fuel cells. Twin turbine generators driving counter-rotating annular ceramic motors. It is equipped with radar and sonar generators. It is armed with hex-cluster pylon-mounted .50 caliber rotary chain gun systems that can rotate a full 360 degrees with 700 rounds per minute cyclic rate of fire as close-range primary weapons. The Scorpion has two pairs of stub-wing pylons to carry its armament. Scorpions carry 190 TK-411 WAFAR (Wrap-Around Fin Aerial Rocket) rockets in ten 19-tube rocket launchers. The use of the rocket varies according to the warhead that can range from tactical applications to impact-based sensor systems. Eight Hawkeye NPB-9 Hellfire (Helicopter Launched Fire-and-forget) missiles are used to engage air-to-air targets in conjunction with the nose-mounted sensor suite. The tail doubles as a rear stabilizer.

C-21 Dragon Assault Ship 

The C-21 Dragon Assault Ship is a large four-post ducted-fan VTOL heavily armed transport and gunship which can deliver AMP suits or troops through drop doors. Quaritch led RDA forces with one of these. Its myriad arsenal of heavy machine guns, dozens upon dozens of rocket and missile pods, and door-gunners makes it the RDA's largest ship so far, with the Valkyrie shuttle being the only larger vehicle designed for extended use in the atmosphere of Pandora. Quad turbine generators drive the four-posted ceramic propellers. The Dragon is heavily armed with multiple weapons systems including grenades, rockets, missiles, and point-defense Gatling cannons. Ability to deploy many troops and AMP suits, variety of medium automatic guns, ATG and ATA missiles, incendiary rockets, grenades, door gunners, plus dual and quad Gatling gun systems. All gun and missile systems are constrained by friendly fire avoidance codes (IFF Lockout). It has twin cockpits. Its propellers counter-rotate to navigate, plus the nose-mounted radar suite. There are eight 50 mm sentry guns mounted below the right cockpit.

GAV Swan 

The GAV Swan is a six-wheeled light utility vehicle. Its full name is the Ground Assault Vehicle JL-723. It has a gyrostabilized platform so when it travels over rough terrain, the gunner platform is stabilized. The extended gunner's chair can rise up 3.6 meters above the vehicle to see over obstructions between the gun and the target, like the long neck of a swan, hence the name. This 6x6 is built for all-terrain, and its permalloy armor and four turret-mounted sixty-millimeter rotary autocannons provide protection from the Pandoran environment. The wheels have little armor and are designed with a thick polymer alloy. Swans have a gyrostabilized system that rotates a full 360 degrees. Swans also have a roll bar and four rear headlights. Swans have redundant fuel cells in the rear. When the chair extends, the ammunition storage canister is located at the back.

Hell's Gate 

Hell's Gate is a secure forward operating base with an airfield, resembling a "modern-day Khe Sanh". Slightly more than a third of the site is taken up by the shuttle runway, VTOL pads, hangars, equipment storage areas, and garage structures. The armor bay is where vehicles come to get stored, repaired, or refitted. This building is the main storage area of all AMP suits. There is also a small weight room inside a weapons locker that Quaritch uses. Designed for security and rapid force deployment, the Armor Bay is the core of Hell's Gate's defenses. Housed inside its fortified hangar and at ready are Dragon Assault Ships configured for forward strike operations, Scorpion Gunships, Samson Helicopters, Model 10 Slash-Cutters, an array of AMP Suits, and other attack craft including support vehicles and assorted battle-ready machinery.

ISV Venture Star 

The ISV Venture Star (also called the Interstellar Vehicle Venture Star) is an interstellar bulk carrier starship that uses antimatter propulsion systems to enable interstellar travel. It transports supplies, equipment, humans in cryonic hibernation, refined ore, and data between Earth and Pandora, taking around six years to travel from one to the other. The Venture Star does not land on the planetary surface, but stations itself in orbit and rendezvous with operations on Earth and Pandora via Valkyrie shuttlecraft that dock with it. The Venture Star is one of twelve RDA ISV mineral carriers, continuously traveling between the Sol and Alpha Centauri A systems. According to film designer Ben Proctor:
The huge glowing radiators mounted to the engines dissipate their heat, and the enormously long central truss, with its own protective coolers and reflectors, protects the cargo and crew modules from the engines' heat and radiation using the simple rule of r-squared attenuation rather than heavy shielding. (Yes, [James Cameron] really thinks about this kind of stuff and explains it very clearly in text and in person.) The ship has a pair of centrifugal-gravity-gen modules for the crew who remain awake for the duration, which has become a pretty typical feature of quasi-realistic ship designs in movies. But one unique feature it has which directly relates to the sub-light realistic travel is a cascade-style shield stack to protect the speeding craft from interstellar debris. Jim's [brief] completely explains this technology, apparently based on current NASA research, and how it obliterates potentially catastrophic particles by letting them slam through a series of thin, light shield surfaces.

The ship was based on designs by scientist and author Charles Pellegrino, who served as a science advisor on the film,  and deceased scientist and author Robert L. Forward. It also resembles the spaceship Discovery One from the movie 2001: A Space Odyssey.

Valkyrie TAV 

The Valkyrie TAV is a delta-wing shuttlecraft/aircraft used to transport equipment and personnel between ISV Venture Star and Hell's Gate on Pandora and its chief purpose is to bring Unobtanium to the spacecraft. The Valkyrie's official name is SSTO-TAV-37 B-class shuttlecraft. The Valkyrie has a payload of up to 60 armed troops, 25 AMP suits, 25 tons of refined Unobtanium, and/or supplies. Two Valkyries carried by the ISV Venture Star are used for the transfer of personnel and cargo between the orbiting ISV and the surface of Pandora. It has VTOL capability by rotating its fusion engines which then act like turbojets, and like the C-130 Hercules was adapted as a bomber to drop daisy cutter bombs out of the rear cargo ramp. It can also be fixed with machine-gun nests on the roof of its hull and cargo ramp.

Bridgehead 
Bridgehead is a massive, city-like base stationed near the oceans of Pandora. Roughly the size and layout of Long Beach, California, It was constructed by the RDA due to Earth becoming inhospitable for human life. The site is protected by defensive walls, along with numerous CIWS turrets and missile systems installed on concrete pylons. Most of the site consists of an airfield, a marina, an industrial core, an admin zone, and a 3D Printing facility. Located in its airfield are Dragon Assault Ships, SeaWasp Gunships, SA-9 Kestrels, and other battle-ready vehicles. Located in its new armor bay are arrays AMPs and Skels. Located at its marina are its fleet of sea-going vessels such as the SeaDragon.

SA-9 Kestrel 

The SA-9 Kestrel is a twin ducted-fan VTOL heavily armed utility transport and gunship that replaces the SA-2 Samson when the RDA returned to Pandora. Similar in role and appearance to the UH-60 Black Hawk, Mi-24, or NH90 helicopters. The Kestrel has the same ducted-fan assemblies, which have two coaxial propellers, but it boasts a more advanced rotor system for increased output and efficiency. It is armed with two chin-mounted 20mm guns, two door-mounted machine guns, plus one mounted on the cargo ramp, and two pylons near the cockpit which carry 4 Hellfire missiles, two volley-firing rocket pods, and two 30mm rotary chain guns. It is able to operate in areas with intense magnetic fields thanks to it being equipped with magnetic cancellation units.

AT-101 SeaWasp 

The AT-101 SeaWasp is a quad ducted-fan VTOL gunship that is a successor to the AT-99 Scorpion. Similar in role and appearance to the AH-64 Apache, AH-1Z Viper, or Eurocopter Tiger gunships. The aircraft's primary propulsion are quad co-axial ducted-fan rotor systems, along with two pusher turbine engines for maximum forward propulsion. It's sleek shape is comparable to that of a fighter jet, which makes it a 'half-airplane' due to its aerodynamic performance when operating in Pandora's maritime environments. It is armed with a chin-mounted 30mm rotary chain gun. It has two stub-wing pylons which carry 38 rockets in two 19-tube rocket launchers, 16 Hellfire missiles, as well as two pods on the wingtips for the guided missile system, or tulkun pingers for CET-OPS tulkun hunting missions.

Hexbot 
Hexbots (also known as Swarm Assemblers) are a family of hexapod-like, arc welding robots that are used for construction purposes. Hexbots can use their electric arcs to weld metal. They have impressive maneuverability thanks to their leg structure, allowing them to climb vertical surfaces and move at impressive speeds. They can also transport supplies across bases by carrying them with one set of legs.

Skel-Suit 
Skel-Suits (also known as EXO-32 Light Mobility Platforms) are powered exoskeletons that are about the same size as a Na'vi warrior. They are worn as a skeletal frame and are more akin to motorized stilts. Soldiers at Bridgehead and other RDA installations use these for industrial and military applications. They are controlled in a similar manner to the older AMP Suit. Skels are usually armed with the same weaponry used by Recombiants such as assault rifles, combat knives, and flamethrowers.

S-76 SeaDragon 
The S-76 SeaDragon is a giant CET-OPS WIGE vessel that serves as a mothership for tulkun hunts. The SeaDragon relies on its speed and agility than defense. It can deploy its hunting fleet of sea-going vessels via its top deck, lower deck, and a moon pool located at the keel. It is powered by four giant ducted-fans with contra-rotating propellers and it can lift itself out of the water via wings and hydrofoils. The vessel is manufactured at Bridgehead via stereolithography.

Mako Sub 
The Mako Sub (also known as the MS-3 Type 2) is a midget submarine/submersible used for short-ranged scouting, underwater defense/exploration, and tulkun hunts. It complements a crew of two, a pilot who operates sitting in regular position, and a gunner who operates sitting in prone position. Its propulsion consists of three ducted propellers powered by fuel cells. It also boasts four folding winglets that give the sub hydrodynamic maneuverability. It is usually armed with a rotary speargun, four harpoon torpedoes with inflatable lift bags, and wildlife nets.

Crab Suit 
The Crab Suit (also known as the SMP-2) is a submersible/mech hybrid that functions as an underwater AMP Suit that resembles a crab, hence the name. Powered by an electrically-driven ducted fan, the Crab Suit is supported by four legs, plus a set of forward-facing arms which are all unfurled (Crab Mode) when in land or sea, but they can also retract entirely (Sub Mode) when underwater. With its body made from lightweight carbon fiber and armed with a rotary speargun, its roles are deep-sea exploration, recovery of tulkun catches, and functioning as a security and defense unit.

Picador Jetboat 
The Picador (also known as the Picador 9300) is a small and fast jetboat used for short-range patrol missions and tulkun hunts. It complements a crew of five operators: a pilot, three gunners, and a spotter. Powered by twin jet drives, the seacraft is armed with two .50 caliber machine guns, one or two grenade launchers, or one sound cannon. It is equipped with smokescreen launchers for defense or strategic retreat. The boat is also equipped with a sensor on its roof that contains the radar, cameras, and other sensor equipment, alongside a HUD display on the cockpit windscreen.

Matador Gunboat 
The Matador Gunboat is a high-speed forward command patrol boat used for water patrol missions. The Matador is operated by a crew of seven to eight operators: five gunners, a pilot, a spotter, and a captain. The boat features a "deep-V" hull, twin jet drives, and shock-mitigating seats. The Matador is armed with three .50 caliber machine guns on the boat's port, starboard, and stern, a co-axial depth charge launcher on top of the second deck next to the pilot, and a large harpoon cannon on the bow.

Reception
Owen Gleiberman of Entertainment Weekly writes, "Cameron turns Pandora into a vertiginously suspended forest landscape...Jake and the sexy tribal princess Neytiri (Zoë Saldana) wow us with their fluid, prancing movements, but there's no subtext to their smoothly virtual faces." Carol Kaesuk Yoon of the New York Times wrote that Avatar "has recreated what is the heart of biology: the naked, heart-stopping wonder of really seeing the living world".

CNN reported that the film's universe has had a profound effect on the audience over their perception of Earth, and life on it, in reality. Avatar Forums posted a topic thread entitled "Ways to cope with the depression of the dream of Pandora being intangible" which received "1,000 posts from people experiencing depression and fans trying to help them cope" (a second thread was posted for more room). Philippe Baghdassarian, the site administrator, commented "I wasn't depressed myself. In fact, the movie made me happy, but I can understand why it made people depressed. The movie was so beautiful and it showed something we don't have here on Earth. I think people saw we could be living in a completely different world and that caused them to be depressed." Many have confessed to falling to depression and harboring suicidal thoughts, while others have expressed disgust towards humanity and "disengagement with reality." Psychiatrist Dr. Stephan Quentzel added that "Virtual life is not real life and it never will be, but this is the pinnacle of what we can build in a virtual presentation so far."

In February 2010, CNN published an article exploring the "Avatar science" (the technology linking the human mind to a remotely controlled body). Elizabeth Landau wrote, "Scientists say we are many decades, even centuries, away from making this kind of sophisticated interaction possible, if it can be done at all." A neuroscientist at the University of Pittsburgh, Andrew Schwartz, further commented that it "shouldn't be taken as anything but fantasy."

Notes

References

External links

"The Complete History Of Pandora, According To Avatar's Designers" at io9.com
"The Tet Zoo guide to the creatures of Avatar" at Tetrapod Zoology
Is the 'Avatar' Concept Really Possible? by CNN

Avatar (franchise)
Works set on fictional moons
Avatar
Pandora
Fiction about gas giants
Overpopulation fiction
Science fiction by franchise
Fictional elements introduced in 2009